Jewess with Oranges is an oil painting on canvas by Aleksander Gierymski finished in 1881 and purchased by the National Museum, Warsaw in 1928. It was looted by the Nazis in Germany-occupied Poland during World War II, and recovered only in 2011.

Description
It was painted in oil technique between 1880 and 1881 in Warsaw. The painting shows a Jewish shopkeeper, whom the artist immortalized in another image Jewess with Lemons. The woman has poor clothing, a cap on her head, and a scarf on her shoulders. She is carrying two baskets of oranges. The background depicts the roofs of Warsaw houses. The woman's face is serious. Her highlighted cheeks as well as prominent wrinkles heighten the effect of sadness and helplessness, which emanates directly from her character. In contrast, there are the oranges whose color is a reference to life, heat, and the southern climate. The painter signed his name in the lower left corner and put the name of the city where he painted the picture.

History
The image originally belonged to the antique store Dom Sztuki in Warsaw and was purchased by the National Museum of Warsaw on 23 February 1928. During the World War II looting of Poland, the painting was stolen by German forces. Since 1945, Poland sought the discovery of its whereabouts and its return. On 26 November 2010, the painting appeared in an antique market in Buxtehude, Germany. The Polish Ministry of Culture and National Heritage began negotiations to bring the painting back to Poland. The talks were successful, and on 15 July 2011, after compensation was paid out by the Polish PZU Foundation to the German owner, Jewess with Oranges returned to the National Museum. The amount paid has not been disclosed.

See also
 Nazi plunder
 Portrait of Adele Bloch-Bauer I—a painting stolen by the Nazis and recovered by Maria Altmann
 World War II looting of Poland

References

1881 paintings
Food and drink paintings
Genre paintings
Jews and Judaism in art
Nazi-looted art
Oil on canvas paintings
Paintings by Aleksander Gierymski
Paintings in the collection of the National Museum, Warsaw
Paintings of people
Recovered works of art